Spheroidal wave functions are solutions of the Helmholtz equation that are found by writing the equation in spheroidal coordinates and applying the technique of separation of variables, just like the use of spherical coordinates lead to spherical harmonics. They are called oblate spheroidal wave functions  if oblate spheroidal coordinates are used and prolate spheroidal wave functions  if prolate spheroidal coordinates are used.
If instead of the Helmholtz equation, the Laplace equation is solved in spheroidal coordinates using the method of separation of variables, the spheroidal wave functions reduce to the spheroidal harmonics. With oblate spheroidal coordinates, the solutions 
are called oblate harmonics and with prolate spheroidal coordinates, prolate harmonics. Both type of spheroidal harmonics
are expressible in terms of Legendre functions.

See also
 Oblate spheroidal coordinates, especially the section Oblate spheroidal harmonics, for a more extensive discussion.
 Oblate spheroidal wave function

References
Notes

Bibliography
 C. Niven On the Conduction of Heat in Ellipsoids of Revolution. Philosophical transactions of the Royal Society of London, v. 171 p. 117 (1880)
 M. Abramowitz and I. Stegun, Handbook of Mathematical function (US Gov. Printing Office, Washington DC, 1964)

Partial differential equations
Special functions